Roy Boyd (born 18 August 1938) is an English actor best known for his roles on television between 1963 and 2010.

His TV credits include The Saint, Counterstrike, The Borderers, Codename, Colditz, The Zoo Gang, The Sweeney, Warship, Doctor Who (in the serial The Hand of Fear), Survivors, The New Avengers,  Space: 1999, The Professionals, Secret Army, Van der Valk, Blake's 7,  Minder, Dempsey and Makepeace, The Bill, Heartbeat and New Tricks. From 1980 to 1983, Boyd had a recurring role as criminal Eddie Lee in the long running soap opera Crossroads. His film credits include appearances in The Wicker Man (1973), The Omen (1976), A Nightingale Sang in Berkeley Square (1979), Biggles (1986) and Asylum (2005). In 1990, he portrayed the elderly Lord Drinian in the BBC adaptation of The Silver Chair, the final instalment of the BBC's adaptation of the Narnia books.

Personal life
He married Fatma Zohra Sadou and has three children.

Partial filmography
The Saint and the Fiction Makers (1968) - McCord
Wolfshead: The Legend of Robin Hood (1969) - Geoffrey of Doncaster
Twins of Evil (1971) - Dying Man (uncredited)
The Wicker Man (1973) - Broome
The Omen (1976) - Reporter
A Nightingale Sang in Berkeley Square (1979) - Security Guard
The Year of the Bodyguard (1982) - 'Captain' in Androcles
Tuxedo Warrior (1982) - Chief Inspector Andy
Biggles (1986) - German N.C.O
Asylum (2005) - Trevor Wiliams

External links
 

1938 births
Living people
English male film actors
English male television actors
People from Croydon